STS-79 was the 17th flight of Space Shuttle Atlantis, and the 79th mission of the Space Shuttle program. The flight saw Atlantis dock with the Russian space station Mir to deliver equipment, supplies and relief personnel. A variety of scientific experiments were also conducted aboard Atlantis by her crew. It was the first shuttle mission to rendezvous with a fully assembled Mir, and the fourth rendezvous of a shuttle to the space station.

Crew

Mission highlights
STS-79 was the first shuttle mission to a fully completed Mir space station, following the arrival of its Priroda module. Atlantis carried the  Orbiter Docking System. This spaceflight was highlighted by the collection of American astronaut Shannon Lucid after 188 days in space, the first American crewmember exchange aboard the Russian Space Station Mir, and the fourth Shuttle-Mir docking. Lucid's long-duration spaceflight set a new American record, as well as worldwide spaceflight record for a woman astronaut.  She embarked to Mir March 22 on the STS-76 mission. Succeeding her on Mir for an approximately four-month stay was John Blaha, who returned in January 1997 with the STS-81 crew. American astronaut Jerry Linenger replaced him.

STS-79 also marked the second flight of the SPACEHAB module in support of a Shuttle-Mir docking and the first flight of the SPACEHAB Double Module configuration. The forward portion of the double module housed experiments conducted by the crew before, during and after Atlantis was docked to the Russian space station. The aft portion of the double module housed the logistics equipment to be transferred to Mir, which included food, clothing, experiments, supplies, and spare equipment.

The Shuttle-Mir link-up occurred at 15:13 UTC on September 18, following R-bar approach. Hatches opened at 05:40 on September 19, and Blaha and Lucid exchanged places at 11:00. Awaiting Blaha on Mir were Valery Korzun, Mir 22 commander, and Alexander Kaleri, flight engineer.

Three experiments were also transferred: the Biotechnology System (BTS) for study of cartilage development; the Material in Devices as Superconductors (MIDAS) experiment to measure electrical properties of high-temperature superconductor materials; and the Commercial Generic Bioprocessing Apparatus (CGBA), containing several smaller experiments, including self-contained aquatic systems.

During her approximately six-month stay on Mir, Lucid conducted research in the following fields: advanced technology, Earth sciences, fundamental biology, human life sciences, microgravity research and space sciences. Specific experiments included: Environmental Radiation Measurements to ascertain ionizing radiation levels aboard Mir; Greenhouse-Integrated Plant Experiments, to study effect of microgravity on plants, specifically dwarf wheat; and Assessment of Humoral Immune Function During Long-Duration Space Flight, to gather data on effect of long-term spaceflight on the human immune system and involving collection of blood serum and saliva samples. Some of this research was conducted in the newest and final Mir module, Priroda, which arrived at station during Lucid's stay.

Three experiments remained on Atlantis: Extreme Temperature Translation Furnace (ETTF), a new furnace design allowing space-based processing up to 871 degrees Celsius (1,600 degrees Fahrenheit) and above; Commercial Protein Crystal Growth (CPCG) complement of 128 individual samples involving 12 different proteins; and Mechanics of Granular Materials, designed to further understanding of behavior of cohesionless granular materials, which could in turn lead to better understanding of how Earth's surface responds during earthquakes and landslides.

As with all Shuttle-Mir flights, risk-mitigation experiments were conducted to help reduce development risk for the International Space Station. Flying for first time was the Active Rack Isolation System (ARIS), an experiment rack designed to cushion payloads from vibration and other disturbances.

Conducted near the end of STS-79 was a test using Atlantis's small vernier jets to lower her orbit. A similar maneuver was made at end of second Hubble Space Telescope servicing mission, STS-82, to re-boost Hubble to a higher orbit while still in orbiter payload bay.

Gallery

See also

List of human spaceflights
List of Space Shuttle missions
Outline of space science

References

External links
 NASA mission summary 
 STS-79 Video Highlights 

Spacecraft launched in 1996
STS-079